The 1952–53 Nationalliga A season was the 15th season of the Nationalliga A, the top level of ice hockey in Switzerland. Eight teams participated in the league, and EHC Arosa won the championship.

Regular season

Relegation 
 EHC Basel-Rotweiss - HC Ambrì-Piotta 3:7

External links
 Championnat de Suisse 1952/53

National League (ice hockey) seasons
Swiss
1952–53 in Swiss ice hockey